Prince Rahotep was a prince in ancient Egypt during the 4th Dynasty. He was probably a son of Pharaoh Sneferu and his first wife, although Zahi Hawass suggests his father was Huni.

Rahotep (R' htp) means "Ra is Satisfied". Ra is a god of the Sun. Hotep means "satisfied". (Another meaning is 'Ra-peaceful', 'Ra-content'.) D21:D36-R4:X1*Q3

Biography
Rahotep’s titles were inscribed on a magnificent statue of him which, with a statue of his wife, was excavated from his mastaba at Meidum in 1871 by Auguste Mariette. These describe him as High Priest of Ra at Heliopolis (with the added title, unique to Heliopolis, Ra’s town, of "Greatest of Seers"), Director of Expeditions and Supervisor of Works. He also has a title given to high nobility, "the son of the king, begotten of his body".

Rahotep's older brother was Nefermaat I, and his younger brother was Ranefer. Rahotep died when he was young, and so his half-brother Khufu became pharaoh after Sneferu’s death.

Rahotep’s wife was Nofret. Her parents are not known.

Nofret and Rahotep had three sons – Djedi, Itu and Neferkau – and three daughters – Mereret, Nedjemib and Sethtet. They are depicted in Rahotep’s tomb.

Representations of Rahotep

References

Princes of the Fourth Dynasty of Egypt
High Priests of Re
Year of death unknown
Year of birth unknown